Araki is a surname in various cultures.

Japanese
Notable people with the Japanese surname Araki ( or ) include:

Entertainers
 Gregg Araki (born 1959), American movie director
 , Japanese manga artist
 , Japanese actor
 , Japanese voice actress
 Kanao Araki, Japanese manga artist
 , Japanese fashion model and hostess
 , Japanese animation artist and character designer
 , Japanese film director, screenwriter, and actor
 , Japanese animation director
 , Japanese actress

Sportspeople
 , Japanese badminton player
 , Japanese footballer
 , Japanese baseball pitcher (Nippon Professional Baseball league)
 , Japanese footballer 
 , Japanese modern pentathlete
 , Japanese volleyball player
 , Japanese baseball player (Nippon Professional Baseball league)
 , Japanese footballer
 , Japanese water polo player
 , Japanese long-distance runner
 , Japanese baseball player (Nippon Professional Baseball league)
 , Japanese ice hockey player
 , Japanese badminton player
 , Japanese figure skater
 , Japanese ice hockey player
 , Japanese footballer
 , Japanese footballer
 , Japanese footballer 
 , Japanese footballer
 , Japanese baseball player (Nippon Professional Baseball league)
 , Japanese fencer
 , Japanese equestrian

Other
 , Japanese politician with the Tomin First no Kai party
 Eikichi Araki (1891–1959), Japanese businessman
 , Japanese astronomer
 , Japanese mathematical physicist
 , Japanese politician with the New Komeito Party
 , samurai of Japan's early Edo period
 , Japanese painter and industrial designer
 , retainer of Nobunaga Oda during Japan's Sengoku period
 , Japanese photographer
 , Imperial Japanese Army general
 , Japanese speech processing engineer
 , Japanese politician, mayor of Hiroshima from 1975 to 1991
 , Japanese print artist
 , Japanese writer
 , Japanese landscape architect
 , youngest-known Japanese Kamikaze pilot killed in World War II

Persian
Notable people with the Persian surname Araki include:
 Mohammad Ali Araki (1894–1994), Iranian religious scholar
 Mohsen Araki (born 1956), Iranian religious scholar

Japanese-language surnames
Persian-language surnames